The Uitpa Formation (E3u) is a fossiliferous geological formation of the Cocinetas Basin in the northernmost department of La Guajira. The formation consists of calcareous mudstones interbedded with lithic sandstones.

Etymology 
The formation was defined by Renz in 1960 and named after Uitpa.

Description

Lithologies 
The Uitpa Formation consists of calcareous mudstones interbedded with lithic sandstones.

Stratigraphy and depositional environment 
The Uitpa Formation overlies the Siamaná Formation and is overlain by the Jimol Formation. The age has been estimated to be Early Miocene, corresponding to the Colhuehuapian in the SALMA classification. The formation has been deposited in an open to deep marine environment.

Petroleum geology 
The Uitpa Formation is a reservoir and seal rock formation in the Guajira Basin.

Fossil content

See also 
 Geology of the Eastern Hills
 Cesar-Ranchería Basin
 Honda Group
 Abanico Formation

References

Bibliography

Local geology

Paleontology

Maps 
 
 
 
 

Geologic formations of Colombia
Neogene Colombia
Aquitanian (stage)
Burdigalian
Miocene Series of South America
Colhuehuapian
Mudstone formations
Sandstone formations
Deep marine deposits
Open marine deposits
Reservoir rock formations
Seal rock formations
Fossiliferous stratigraphic units of South America
Paleontology in Colombia
Geography of La Guajira Department